is Kotoko's sixth maxi single under Geneon Entertainment. The title track was used as an ending theme for OVA of Maria-sama ga Miteru. The lyrics of the song was written by the creator of Maria-sama ga Miteru, Oyuki Konno.

Track listing 
Chercher～シャルシェ～ -- 4:39
Composition: C.G mix
Arrangement: C.G mix
Lyrics: Oyuki Konno
月夜の舞踏会 / Tsukiyo no Butoukai—5:55
Composition: Kazuya Takase
Arrangement: Tomoyuki Nakazawa
Lyrics: Kotoko
Chercher: シャルシェ (Instrumental) -- 4:39
月夜の舞踏会 (Instrumental) / Tsukiyo no butoukai (Instrumental) -- 5:52

Charts and sales

References

2006 singles
2006 songs
Kotoko (singer) songs
Anime songs
Song recordings produced by I've Sound